Servia is an unincorporated community in Chester Township, Wabash County, in the U.S. state of Indiana.

History

An old variant name of the community was called New Madison. The meaning of the name Servia is obscure.

A post office was established under the name New Madison in 1866, was renamed to Servia in 1883, where it has been operating since.

Geography

References

Unincorporated communities in Wabash County, Indiana
Unincorporated communities in Indiana